The 2017–18 Maryland Eastern Shore Hawks men's basketball team represented the University of Maryland Eastern Shore during the 2017–18 NCAA Division I men's basketball season. The Hawks, led by fourth-year head coach Bobby Collins, played their home games at Hytche Athletic Center in Princess Anne, Maryland as members of the Mid-Eastern Athletic Conference. They finished the season 7-25, 3-13 in MEAC play to finish in 12th place. As the No. 12 seed in the MEAC tournament, they lost to Norfolk State in the first round.

On March 26, 2018, it was announced that head coach Bobby Collins' contract would not be renewed. He finished at UMES with a four-year record of 49–82. The school named assistant coach Clifford Reed interim head coach for the 2018–19 season.

Previous season
The Hawks finished the 2016–17 season 14–20, 9–7 in MEAC play to finish in sixth place. They defeated North Carolina A&T and Bethune–Cookman in the MEAC tournament before losing in the semifinals to North Carolina Central.

Awards
Preseason All-MEAC 2nd Team
 Ryan Andino

Emerald Coast Classic All–Tournament Team
 Ahmad Frost

Roster

Schedule and results

|-
!colspan=9 style=| Exhibition

|-
!colspan=9 style=| Non-conference regular season

|-
!colspan=9 style=| MEAC regular season

|-
!colspan=9 style=| MEAC tournament

References

Maryland Eastern Shore Hawks men's basketball seasons
Maryland Eastern Shore